Events in the year 1961 in Ireland.

Incumbents
 President: Éamon de Valera
 Taoiseach: Seán Lemass (FF)
 Tánaiste:  Seán MacEntee (FF)
 Minister for Finance: James Ryan (FF)
 Chief Justice: 
Conor Maguire (until 11 June 1961)
Cearbhall Ó Dálaigh (from 16 June 1961)
 Dáil: 
16th (until 8 September 1961)
17th (from 11 October 1961)
 Seanad: 
9th (until 1 September 1961)
10th (from 14 December 1961)

Events
 6 January – Lieutenant-General Seán Mac Eoin left Dublin for to the Congo. He was taking up his new post as General Commanding Officer of the United Nations.
 20 January – John F. Kennedy became President of the United States, the first of Irish-Catholic descent.
 27 January – Laid-up tanker Trigonosemus broke free from her moorings during a gale in Lough Swilly.
 9 April – The national census showed that County Cork's population had reached an all-time low, with just 330,000 (in the late 1950s it was 336,000).
 10 June – President Éamon de Valera and Mrs. Sinéad de Valera greeted Prince Rainier and Princess Grace of Monaco at their home, Áras an Uachtaráin during the couple's state visit to Ireland.
 15 June – Prince Rainier and Princess Grace took tea in the Kelly homestead, Drimurla, near Newport, County Mayo from which the Princess's grandfather, John Henry Kelly, set off for America almost 100 years before.
 16 September – Atlantic Hurricane Debbie made landfall at Dooega on Achill Island, then tracked across County Mayo, the only known tropical cyclone to make landfall in Ireland. Winds gusted up to 114 mph (183 km/h) off Arranmore.
 4 October – 1961 Irish general election: The Fianna Fáil party under Seán Lemass retained most seats and formed a minority government when members of the 17th Dáil assembled on 11 October. 
 25 October – St. John's Church in Sligo was reconstituted as the Cathedral Church for the Church of Ireland dioceses of Elphin and Ardagh, under the name of the Cathedral of St. Mary the Virgin and St. John the Baptist.
 November – Minister for Justice Charles Haughey established military courts which handed down long prison sentences to convicted Irish Republican Army men.
 10 November – The Guinness ship Lady Gwendolen rammed and sank the Freshfield, anchored in fog in the River Mersey.
 20 December – The last legal execution in Ireland, of Robert McGladdery for murder, occurred in Belfast, Northern Ireland.
 31 December – Telefís Éireann went on the air as President de Valera inaugurated the new service. The station's first broadcast was a New Year countdown with celebrations at the Gresham Hotel and O'Connell Street, Dublin, relayed from the Kippure transmitter.
 The last Irish Sea sail-using cargo vessel (and the last sail ship to trade on the Mersey), the Arklow auxiliary schooner De Wadden, ceased trading commercially.
 German writer Enno Stephan's book Geheimauftrag Irland: Deutsche Agenten im Irischen Untergrundkampf 1939-1945 gave the first full account of Nazi spies in Ireland during "The Emergency" (the World War II period in Ireland).

Arts and literature
 Dominic Behan's autobiography Tell Dublin I Miss Her and autobiographical novel Teems of Times were published.
 John Montague's poetry Poisoned Lands was published.
 Tom Murphy's play A Whistle in the Dark premièred at the Theatre Royal Stratford East in London.

Sports
 St Patrick's Athletic won the FAI Cup.
 Drumcondra F.C. won the League of Ireland.
 Linfield F.C. won the Irish League and the Irish Cup double.

Births
 5 January – Rachel Hardiman, Irish cricketer
 6 January – Fergal Keane, writer and broadcast journalist.
 19 January – Eoghan Corry, journalist and author.
 25 January – Liam Currams, Offaly hurler and Gaelic footballer.
 28 February – Barry McGuigan, world featherweight champion boxer.
 8 March – Kevin Hennessy, Cork hurler.
 20 March – Michael O'Leary, chief executive of the low-cost airline Ryanair.
 27 March – Mark Cohen, cricketer.
 28 March – Orla Brady, actress.
 17 May
 Enya, singer.
 Mairéad Ní Mhaonaigh, fiddle player and singer.
 21 May – John Cregan, Fianna Fáil party Teachta Dála (TD) for Limerick West.
 1 June – Michael Nugent, writer and dramatist.
 2 June – Liam Cunningham, actor.
 3 July – Mark Keane, cognitive scientist and author.
 7 August – Roddy Collins, association football player and manager.
 8 August – The Edge, guitarist with U2.
 27 August – John Hodgins, Cork hurler.
 30 August – Ger Cunningham, Cork hurler.
 25 September – Ronnie Whelan, soccer player.
 13 October – Michael Walsh, Kilkenny hurler.
 25 October – Willie Walsh, chief executive officer of Aer Lingus and British Airways.
 27 October – Margaret Mazzantini, writer.
 31 October – Larry Mullen, rock drummer with U2.
 8 November – Seán Haughey, Fianna Fáil TD for Dublin North-East, son of Charles Haughey and Maureen Haughey.
 11 December – Dave King, vocalist and songwriter.
 12 December – Daniel O'Donnell, singer.
 Full date unknown

 Michelle Rocca, socialite.
 Kevin Sharkey, songwriter and painter.
 John Spillane, singer songwriter.

Deaths
 14 January – Barry Fitzgerald, Academy Award-winning actor (born 1888).
 18 January – Joseph Connolly, Fianna Fáil politician (born 1885).
 4 February – Edward Pakenham, 6th Earl of Longford, politician, dramatist and poet (born 1902).
 7 May – Carmel Snow, journalist and editor of the American edition of Harper's Bazaar from 1934 to 1958 (born 1887).
 12 August – Sir Ion Hamilton Benn, 1st Baronet, businessman and British politician (born 1863).
 25 September – James Crichton, soldier, recipient of the Victoria Cross for gallantry in 1918 at Crèvecœur, France (born 1879).
 6 October – Achey Kelly, cricketer (born 1903).
 16 November – T. C. Hammond, Anglican clergyman, Principal of Moore Theological College, Sydney (born 1877).
 8 December – Séumas Robinson, member of Irish Volunteers and Irish Republican Army (born 1888).
 24 December – Con Clifford, retired Kerry Gaelic footballer and businessman (born 1887).
 Full date unknown – Patrick MacDonogh, poet (born 1902).

See also
 1961 in Irish television

References

 
1960s in Ireland
Ireland
Years of the 20th century in Ireland